Arthur Forbes may refer to:

Arthur Forbes, 5th Lord Forbes (died 1493), Lord Forbes
Arthur Forbes, 9th Lord Forbes (1581–1641), Lord Forbes
Arthur Forbes, 1st Earl of Granard (1623–1696), Irish soldier
Sir Arthur Forbes, 1st Baronet (c. 1590–1632)
Arthur Forbes, 9th Earl of Granard (1915–1992), British peer
Arthur Forbes Gordon Kilby (1885–1915), English recipient of the Victoria Cross
Arthur Forbes, 2nd Earl of Granard (c. 1656–1734), Earl of Granard
Sir Arthur Forbes, 4th Baronet (1709–1773), British Member of Parliament for Aberdeenshire
Sir Arthur Forbes, 6th Baronet (1784–1823), of the Forbes baronets
Arthur Forbes (Royal Navy officer) (died 1891), British admiral
Arthur C. Forbes (1866–1950), English forestry expert